Two ships in the United States Navy have been named USS Parker for Foxhall A. Parker, Jr.

See also
 , a 

United States Navy ship names